Manly is a suburb on the Whangaparaoa Peninsula, towards the northern end of Auckland, New Zealand. Manly Village is an established shopping centre, with the residential areas of Big Manly Beach to the north and Little Manly Beach to the south. The area was once a seaside holiday location, but has become residential suburbs within commuting distance of central Auckland city.

Demographics

Manly had a population of 5,904 at the 2018 New Zealand census, an increase of 261 people (4.6%) since the 2013 census, and an increase of 651 people (12.4%) since the 2006 census. There were 2,238 households, comprising 2,829 males and 3,075 females, giving a sex ratio of 0.92 males per female, with 1,065 people (18.0%) aged under 15 years, 993 (16.8%) aged 15 to 29, 2,562 (43.4%) aged 30 to 64, and 1,284 (21.7%) aged 65 or older.

Ethnicities were 92.7% European/Pākehā, 9.5% Māori, 3.1% Pacific peoples, 3.8% Asian, and 1.5% other ethnicities. People may identify with more than one ethnicity.

The percentage of people born overseas was 26.2, compared with 27.1% nationally.

Although some people chose not to answer the census's question about religious affiliation, 55.8% had no religion, 33.6% were Christian, 0.3% had Māori religious beliefs, 0.4% were Hindu, 0.2% were Muslim, 0.9% were Buddhist and 1.9% had other religions.

Of those at least 15 years old, 1,005 (20.8%) people had a bachelor's or higher degree, and 720 (14.9%) people had no formal qualifications. 1,038 people (21.5%) earned over $70,000 compared to 17.2% nationally. The employment status of those at least 15 was that 2,280 (47.1%) people were employed full-time, 696 (14.4%) were part-time, and 165 (3.4%) were unemployed.

History 
Initially inhabited primarily by Ngāti Kahu, Manly is also home to two Pā sites. In 1851 it was brought by the Crown as part of the Mahurangi purchase. By the 1890s, the land was settled by the Polkinghorne family.

In the 1920s, Ted Brown and Laurie Taylor began development of the area, also constructing a pier off Little Manly Beach. During this time the region was renamed after Manly a geographically similar seaside suburb north of Sydney.

Around 1927 the Hopper Family moved into the area, and farmed the area for a number of years. Later in the 1950s, the family then began subdividing the remaining land along with various other parts of the Hibiscus Coast.

Beaches 
Manly is home to three Whangaparaoa Peninsula beaches, two on the northern and one on the southern side. The largest and most notable is the soft, white, sandy, and popular swimming location Big Manly Beach.  The Beach stretches approximately 1.25 kilometres and looks out over Whangaparāoa Bay. Over the summer months, a swimming pontoon is usually moored at Big Manly Beach. 

Big Manly is accompanied by Swann Beach, which sits to the west, together forming Polkinghornes Bay. 

Little Manly, which is located on the southern side, is known for its calm and picturesque outlook and conditions. At a length of around 300 metres Little Manly is one of the peninsula's smaller beaches. In 2018, Little Manly also gained a swimming pontoon which is moored there over the summer.

Education
Whangaparaoa School is a coeducational contributing primary (years 1-6) school with a roll of  students as of  The school celebrated its centenary in 2002.

Sport and Recreation

Sailing 
The Manly Sailing Club hosts a variety of Regional, National and International regattas off the coast of Big Manly Beach. The club also provides a variety of Learn to Sail Programmes through the Russell Coutts Sailing Foundation, and has links to schools in the area.

Bowling 
Manly is also home to the Manly Bowling Club each year hosts a number of bowling, and social events.

Tennis 
Manly is home to two tennis clubs, situated in both Edith Hopper Park and Manly Park. 

The Whangaparaoa Tennis Club is the larger of the two and situated in Edith Hopper Park. The tennis club was established in 1951 in Manly Park, where the Manly Park Seniors Club is now located and later shifted to it current location in Edith Hopper Park in 1978.  The club provides six artifical flood-lit courts, and accompanying facilities,  offering courses for people of all ages and skill levels.  

Situated in Manly Park, alongside the bowling club, the Manly Park Seniors Tennis Club has four courts as well as accompanying facilities.

Netball 
The Hibiscus Coast Netball Centre is home to six netball courts is located in Edith Hopper Park. On  the Hibiscus Coast Netball Centre voted in favour of Netball North Harbour taking over administration of the club.

Triathlon 
Manly Park has a number of times hosted the Weet-bix Tryathlon.

Notes

External links
 Whangaparaoa School website

Populated places in the Auckland Region
Beaches of the Auckland Region
Hibiscus Coast